The In Sound from Way Out! may refer to:

 The In Sound from Way Out! (Perrey and Kingsley album), 1966
 The In Sound from Way Out! (Beastie Boys album), 1996